Peter Johnston (born 25 February 1968) is an Australian former professional rugby league footballer who played for the Parramatta Eels, South Sydney Rabbitohs and Illawarra Steelers in the NSWRL/ARL.

Playing career
A prop known for his big hits, Johnston started his first-grade career at Parramatta in 1989. After three seasons with the Eels he had two-season stints at South Sydney and Illawarra, before finishing his career back at Parramatta. 

His last first-grade appearance, a loss to North Sydney in the 1997 finals series, was the only final he played in his 133-game career.

Post playing
Johnston now runs a Subway franchise in Wollongong.

References

External links
Peter Johnston at Rugby League project

1968 births
Living people
Australian rugby league players
Illawarra Steelers players
Parramatta Eels players
Place of birth missing (living people)
Rugby league props
Rugby league second-rows
South Sydney Rabbitohs players